The Last One to Know is the twelfth studio album by American country music artist Reba McEntire, released on September 7, 1987, by MCA Nashville. The title track and Love Will Find Its Way to  You were both Number One singles from the album. It was also her first album to chart on the Billboard 200, in addition to peaking at #3 on Top Country Albums. "Just Across the Rio Grande" was also covered by Holly Dunn the following year in Across the Rio Grande.

Track listing

Personnel

Vocals
 Suzy Hoskins – harmony vocals
 Reba McEntire – lead and harmony vocals

Musicians

 John Barlow Jarvis – acoustic piano, Yamaha DX7
 Richard Bennett – electric guitar
 Bill Cooley – acoustic guitar, electric guitar
 David Hungate – bass guitar 
 Russ Kunkel – drums
 Donnie LaValley – dobro, steel guitar 
 Fred Newell – electric guitar
 Don Potter – acoustic guitar 
 Leland Sklar – bass guitar
 Ricky Solomon – fiddle, mandolin

Production
 Chuck Ainlay – mixing
 Milan Bogdan – digital editing
 Bob Bullock – overdub recording
 Jimmy Bowen – producer
 Mark J. Coddington – second engineer 
 Katherine DeVault – design
 Tim Kish – second engineer 
 Simon Levy – art direction
 Russ Martin – second engineer
 Reba McEntire – producer 
 Jim McGuire – photography
 Glenn Meadows – mastering
 Jessie Noble – project coordinator
 Ann Payne – styling
 Willie Pevear – overdub recording 
 Steve Tillisch – overdub recording
 Ron Treat – recording engineer 
 Marty Williams – second engineer 

Studios 
 Recorded at Emerald Sound Studios (Nashville, Tennessee)
 Mixed at Sound Stage Studios (Nashville, Tennessee)
 Mastered at Masterfonics (Nashville, Tennessee)

Charts

Album

Singles

Certifications

References

1987 albums
Reba McEntire albums
MCA Records albums
Albums produced by Jimmy Bowen